Ramus circumflexus can refer to:
 Circumflex branch of left coronary artery (ramus circumflexus arteriae coronariae sinistrae)
 Circumflex fibular artery (ramus circumflexus fibularis arteriae tibialis posterioris)